The 10th National Games of the People's Republic of China was a multi-sport event that was held in Nanjing City, Jiangsu Province, from 12–23 October 2005.

As a premier national sporting event, the 10th National Games of the People's Republic of China aimed to identify and nurture athlete talents and build up the national teams for the 2008 Olympic Games in Beijing.

Participation
The Games featured a total of 47 participating teams from: Chinese People's Liberation Army, Beijing Municipality, Tianjin City, Hebei Province, Shanxi Province, Inner Mongolia Autonomous Region, Liaoning Province, Jilin Province, Heilongjiang Province, Shanghai City, Jiangsu Province, Zhejiang Province, Anhui Province, Fujian Province, Jiangxi Province, Shandong Province, Henan Province, Hubei Province, Hunan Province, Guangdong Province, Zhuang Autonomous Region of Guangxi, Hainan Province, Chongqing City, Sichuan Province, Guizhou Province, Yunnan Province, Tibet Autonomous Region, Shaanxi Province, Gansu Province, Qinghai Province, Hui Autonomous Region of Ningxia, Uygur Autonomous Region of Xinjiang, Taiwan Province, the Macau Special Administrative Region, the Hong Kong Special Administrative Region and sports associations across the country.

Sports
There were a total of 32 events at the 10th National Games.

  Diving
  Swimming
  Synchronized swimming
  Water polo

 Artistic gymnastics
 Rhythmic gymnastics
 Trampoline gymnastics

 Figure skating
 Short speed skating
 Long speed skating

Medal table

Notes
Teams with * are not province teams but other trades & organizations.
Medals of athletes of every team received in 2004 Olympics and 2002 Winter Olympics are taken into the medal count of that team.

References 

 
National Games of China
National Games of China
2005 in Chinese sport
Sport in Nanjing